Taleh Jerd-e Olya (also Romanized as Taleh Jerd-e ‘Olyā and Taleh Jerd Olya; also known as Talah Jerd, Taleh Jerd-e Bālā, and Telehjerd-e Bālā) is a village in Kamazan-e Sofla Rural District, Zand District, Malayer County, Hamadan Province, Iran. At the 2006 census, its population was 134, in 31 families.

References 

Populated places in Malayer County